Moran is an unincorporated community in Prince Edward County, Virginia, United States. Moran is in a fairly remote section of the Virginia countryside and was one time a bustling area called "Beck" with a rural post office. At that time the village was very active with the main industries being tobacco and pulpwood that was cut and shipped on the railroad. The Norfolk and Western gave up the spur line because of economic conditions and even removed the tracks.

References

Unincorporated communities in Virginia
Unincorporated communities in Prince Edward County, Virginia